A mobile cinema is a cinema on wheels.

An example is the Screen machine Mobile Cinema of Scotland, which provides conventional up-to-date 35mm screenings of recent movies, with full digital surround sound, air conditioning, comfortable raked seating, and full disabled access. The French have their own Cinemobile system. 
There are also smaller mobile cinemas employing digital projection technology. Examples of these include the Sol Cinema in the UK and  Gorilla Cinema, which was established in 2000, and uses solar power and batteries to enable projection in even more remote locations. It often takes place outdoors at night or housed in marquees and other temporary structures. More recently, the mobile cinema world has seen the relaunch of a recently restored 1967 custom built mobile cinema unit (see 'History' below).

Since 2006, Italy's Cortomobile, a mobile cinema seating two viewers, has projected short films and animations in cinema festivals and has been the protagonist of the First Car Film Festival (Florence) in March 2009.

Since 1995, Cinetransformer International of Miami, Florida has circulated a fleet of mobile cinema units for use in event and experiential marketing. With a patented stadium style configuration of 91 seats, the Cinetransformer debuted as the world's first 3D mobile cinema at Comic Con in 2010 with the release of Jackass 3 in 3D. It was chosen again in 2011 to debut Final Destination 5 In 3D.

History
During the Russian Civil War between Communists and counter-revolutionaries, the early cinema pioneer, Dziga Vertov, helped establish and run a film-car on Mikhail Kalinin's agit-train. He had equipment to shoot, develop, edit, and project film. The trains went to battlefronts on agitation-propaganda missions intended primarily to bolster the morale of the troops. They were also intended to stir up revolutionary fervor of the masses.

In the late 1960s, Tony Benn, working under Harold Wilson's Labour government, commissioned seven custom built mobile cinema units for the Ministry of Technology campaign to 'raise standards' and promote British industry. The project was short-lived and the units were sold off at government auction in 1974, most are thought to have been long since decommissioned and disappeared. However, one has survived via purchase by Sir William McAlpine to tour with the Flying Scotsman locomotive he rescued from America, and consequently donated to the Transport Trust in 1975 where it was in preservation for 15 years. It has since been through several private owners and following a full restoration is now in operation as Vintage Mobile Cinema, based in the South West of England. In May 2015, the only remaining Vintage Mobile Cinema was sold and will be moving to its new home on the Hertfordshire/Buckinghamshire border.

Mobile cinema was very popular during the colonial periods in Africa when Land Rovers were used as movie vans to transport a white linen screen, usually mounted on the Land Rover, a portable generator, a 16mm projector and mounted loudspeakers. In this way rural areas received propaganda and educational films, usually shown in the evenings during dark hours.

Worldwide examples

Sol Cinema
The Sol Cinema is based in the UK and seats 8 people, leading it to be billed as the World's smallest solar powered cinema in 2010. It uses an LED projector showing short films in cinematic surroundings complete with usherettes; batteries to store the energy from the Sun to power the cinema. Their photovoltaic panels harness the sunlight, even as the films are being shown so they never run out of power. The Sol Cinema won a Digital Hero award for best use of sustainable technology in 2014. Total Film magazine listed the Sol Cinema at number 26th in the 'Best Movie Cinemas in the World'.

Sol Cinema is booked to perform at Glastonbury Festival each year. It also tours throughout the UK and Ireland.

The Irish travelling Picture show 

Harry McFadden, the only surviving son of five brothers of Jack and Florence McFadden (née Bradley ) has a wealth of information from his days travelling with his mother and fathers mobile picture show. The movies when Jack and' Florrie' started out were silent movies. The 'show' used horses back then. When the 'talkies' came in McFaddens had a large stock of movies, Buck Jones series, Flash Gordon, many westerns, comedies, all genres. They had enough film to last six weeks in a town. Transport changed, pneumatic tyres, stories of my grandfather Jacks' unease at changing from timber wheels, horses replaced by trucks. Years ago Harry had the opportunity to meet Daniel Day Lewis not too long after his movie the 'Last of the Mohicans' was released and he was able to discuss with  pride to Daniel how his family had shown the original movie. Stories are told how, in many rural areas people would flock just to see the electric light bulb that came on when then generator was turned on. 

In Ireland, mobile cinemas operated from the 1920s to the mid-1960s. A portable wooden structure was erected, with seating for up to 250 people. The building had wooden sides and a canvas roof, approximately 40 ft. by 24 ft. The 35mm projector was housed in a caravan at one end of the building. These shows travelled winter and summer in all sorts of weather; at times gales forced them to remove the canvas roof of the cinema sometimes at night when the winds made it hard to do so. There were up to 20 families touring Ireland, mainly in isolated areas where the nearest permanent cinema was miles away. These mobile cinemas stayed up to three weeks in a village before moving to another area. The families lived in caravans had their own generators and a stock of films with them. During the war, transport became difficult as fuel for motor vehicles was in short supply. Some cinemas settled down for the duration of the war, whilst others reverted to horses to move their equipment from village to village and saved their fuel to run the generators. Even then they had to buy extra fuel on the black market at up to 30 shillings a gallon. The children of the showmen went to the local national schools for the duration of their stay; some went to 16 - 18 schools a year. Admission fees were around 1 shilling and 6 pence to 2 shillings for adults around the time when they ceased to tour in the 1960s. The arrival of TV ended these mobile cinemas however they will be remembered for bringing cinema to people in isolated areas some who had never seen talking movies. Most of the films shown were about eight years old and had been bought by the show people who some had up to five weeks stock in hand showing for two hours a night, even though the showman owned the films they did not have the permission to show them to the public without paying excise duty each time they were shown needless to say they did not so every now and then along would come an excise officer and seize a film  or at least just the title of a film.

Most of the families changed to amusement shows, some operated their own circus, others went the way of stage shows some settled down to live in towns and villages. Most are still represented in show business by way of children and grandchildren others have moved to other countries. The names of some of these families are well remembered: The Lyons family, Mullins, Cullens, McCormacs, Courtneys, Lynns, McFaddens, Barrets, Corvinos, Roses, Gazetts, Bradleys, and many more; the names of some have nearly been forgotten by all but the oldest. In 1949, one of these families, Brian Lyons, was featured in the Times Pictorial in a full front page of images of their show and also a large article on other pages. The photos were all taken in Rosscarbery West Cork and contained some shots of locals sitting in the cinema. Over the years, a number of these mobile cinemas went up in flames due mainly to the type of film that was in use which was made up of a nitro solution. Luckily, no one was ever hurt though the buildings were destroyed in most cases. Most of those that suffered this fate were back on the road before long with help from other showmen. Today the name of McCormack, Mullins, McFadden, and Courtney are some of the names that still follow the roads to bring entertainment to the people of Ireland both in the city and remote country areas.

Australia
Since 1999, Road Movie has been involved with unique cinematic events using mobile cinemas throughout South Australia, both in the city and country locations.

References

Film and video terminology